Candler County is a county located in the southeastern part of the U.S. state of Georgia. As of the 2020 census, the population was 10,981. The county seat is Metter. The county was founded in 1914 and named for Allen D. Candler, the 56th governor of Georgia.

Geography

The majority of Candler County is located in the Canoochee River sub-basin of the Ogeechee River basin. The western edge of the county, west of State Route 57, is located in the Ohoopee River sub-basin of the Altamaha River basin.

Major highways
  Interstate 16
  State Route 23
  State Route 46
  State Route 57
  State Route 121
  State Route 129
  State Route 404 (unsigned designation for I-16)

Adjacent counties
 Bulloch County (east)
 Evans County (southeast)
 Tattnall County (south)
 Emanuel County (northwest)

Demographics

2000 census
As of the census of 2000, there were 9,577 people, 3,375 households, and 2,426 families living in the county.  The population density was 39 people per square mile (15/km2).  There were 3,893 housing units at an average density of 16 per square mile (6/km2).  The racial makeup of the county was 65.45% White, 27.08% Black or African American, 0.19% Native American, 0.28% Asian, 0.03% Pacific Islander, 6.16% from other races, and 0.81% from two or more races.  9.21% of the population were Hispanic or Latino of any race.

There were 3,375 households, out of which 33.70% had children under the age of 18 living with them, 52.80% were married couples living together, 14.30% had a female householder with no husband present, and 28.10% were non-families. 23.90% of all households were made up of individuals, and 11.40% had someone living alone who was 65 years of age or older.  The average household size was 2.72 and the average family size was 3.17.

In the county, the population was spread out, with 26.80% under the age of 18, 9.40% from 18 to 24, 26.10% from 25 to 44, 22.50% from 45 to 64, and 15.20% who were 65 years of age or older.  The median age was 36 years. For every 100 females there were 100.60 males.  For every 100 females age 18 and over, there were 96.40 males.

The median income for a household in the county was $25,022, and the median income for a family was $30,705. Males had a median income of $24,482 versus $18,750 for females. The per capita income for the county was $12,958.  About 21.40% of families and 26.10% of the population were below the poverty line, including 36.90% of those under age 18 and 22.00% of those age 65 or over.

2010 census
As of the 2010 United States Census, there were 10,998 people, 4,041 households, and 2,793 families living in the county. The racial makeup of the county was 65.9% white, 24.4% black or African American, 0.5% Asian, 0.1% American Indian, 8.0% from other races, and 1.0% from two or more races. Those of Hispanic or Latino origin made up 11.2% of the population. In terms of ancestry, 10.6% were Irish, 9.4% were English, 8.2% were German, and 4.6% were American.

Of the 4,041 households, 35.2% had children under the age of 18 living with them, 48.1% were married couples living together, 15.7% had a female householder with no husband present, 30.9% were non-families, and 25.5% of all households were made up of individuals. The average household size was 2.65 and the average family size was 3.15. The median age was 37.6 years.

The median income for a household in the county was $35,828 and the median income for a family was $39,105. Males had a median income of $31,348 versus $23,044 for females. The per capita income for the county was $16,068. About 18.5% of families and 22.3% of the population were below the poverty line, including 24.7% of those under age 18 and 16.7% of those age 65 or over.

2020 census

As of the 2020 United States census, there were 10,981 people, 4,013 households, and 2,775 families residing in the county.

Education

Communities

City
 Metter (county seat)

Town
 Pulaski

Politics

See also

 National Register of Historic Places listings in Candler County, Georgia

References

External links
 Candler County
 Candler County historical marker

 
Georgia (U.S. state) counties
1914 establishments in Georgia (U.S. state)
Populated places established in 1914